Pakal-e Garab (also Romanized as Pākal-e Garāb; also known as Garāb, Gorab, Pākal Gadāb, Pākal Garāb, and Pay-e Kal-e Garāb) is a village in Mishkhas Rural District, in the Sivan District of Ilam County, Ilam Province, Iran. At the 2006 census, its population was 1,139, in 203 families. It is the capital village of the Rural district which was established on March 9, 2013. The village is populated by Kurds.

References 

 Populated places in Ilam County
Kurdish settlements in Ilam Province